Semaphorin-6C is a protein that in humans is encoded by the SEMA6C gene.

This gene product is a member of the semaphoring family of proteins. Semaphorins represent important molecular signals controlling multiple aspects of the cellular response that follows CNS injury, and thus may play an important role in neural regeneration.

References

Further reading